Candy For The Clowns is the fifth studio album from British rock band Nine Black Alps. It was released in May 2014 under Hatch Records.

Track list

References

2014 albums
Nine Black Alps albums